James Youll Turnbull VC (24 December 1883 – 1 July 1916) was a Scottish recipient of the Victoria Cross, the highest and most prestigious award for gallantry in the face of the enemy that can be awarded to British and Commonwealth forces.

Before the First World War, he played rugby for Cartha Queens Park RFC and was a member of the 3rd Battalion of the Lanarkshire Rifle Volunteers.

He was a sergeant in the 17th Battalion (Glasgow Commercials), The Highland Light Infantry, British Army during the Battle of the Somme in First World War. On 1 July 1916, Turnbull was awarded the VC for his actions at Leipzig Salient, Authuille, France, where Turnbull's party captured a post of apparent importance, and defended it "almost single-handed[ly]". Later in the day he was killed while engaged in a bombing counter-attack. He was 32 years old.

Citation

Turnbull's grave is located at Lonsdale Cemetery, (four miles north of Albert) Authuille, France in Plot IV, Row G, Grave 9.

References

Monuments to Courage (David Harvey, 1999)
The Register of the Victoria Cross (This England, 1997)
Scotland's Forgotten Valour (Graham Ross, 1995)
VCs of the First World War - The Somme (Gerald Gliddon, 1994)

External links
 

1883 births
1916 deaths
Military personnel from Glasgow
British Battle of the Somme recipients of the Victoria Cross
Highland Light Infantry soldiers
British military personnel killed in the Battle of the Somme
British Army personnel of World War I
Scottish rugby union players
Cartha RFC players
British Army recipients of the Victoria Cross
Rugby union players from Glasgow